Ensifera is a suborder of insects that includes the various types of crickets and their allies including: true crickets, camel crickets, bush crickets or katydids, grigs, weta and Cooloola monsters. This and the suborder Caelifera (grasshoppers and their allies) make up the order Orthoptera. Ensifera is believed to be a more ancient group than Caelifera, with its origins in the Carboniferous period, the split having occurred at the end of the Permian period. Unlike the Caelifera, the Ensifera contain numerous members that are partially carnivorous, feeding on other insects, as well as plants.

Ensifer is Latin for "sword bearer", and refers to the typically elongated and blade-like ovipositor of the females.

Characteristics
Characteristics shared by the two orthopteran suborders, Caelifera and Ensifera, are the mouthparts adapted for biting and chewing, the modified prothorax, the hind legs modified for jumping, the wing shape and venation, and the sound-producing stridulatory organs.

Ensiferans are distinguished from Caeliferans by their elongated, threadlike antennae, which are often longer than the length of their bodies and have over 30 segments (except in the subterranean Cooloolidae family). For this reason, they are sometimes referred to as "long-horned orthopterans". In the families in which the males sing, the fore wings have modifications that include toothed veins and scrapers for making the noise, and the surrounding membranous areas amplify the sound. In these groups, the sound-detecting tympanal organs are located on the tibiae of the front legs. The tarsi have three segments and the ovipositor is blade-like or needle-like. The male attaches the spermatophore externally to the female's gonopore. The spermatophore is often surrounded by a proteinaceous spermatophylax, the function of which is to provide a nutritional nuptial gift to the female.

Taxonomy

The Orthoptera Species File database lists the following superfamilies and families.
Infraorder †Elcanidea 
Superfamily †Elcanoidea 
Family †Elcanidae (Late Triassic - Paleocene)
Family †Permelcanidae (Early Permian - Late Triassic)
Superfamily †Permoraphidioidea 
Family †Permoraphidiidae (Permian)
Family †Pseudelcanidae (Early Permian)
Family †Thueringoedischiidae (Early Permian)
Family incertae sedis
Genus †Acridiites 
Infraorder Gryllidea
Superfamily Grylloidea 
Family †Baissogryllidae 
Family Gryllidae - true crickets
Family Mogoplistidae - scaly crickets
Family Phalangopsidae 
Family †Protogryllidae 
Family Trigonidiidae 
Superfamily Gryllotalpoidea 
Family Gryllotalpidae  – mole crickets
Family Myrmecophilidae  - ant crickets
Infraorder †Oedischiidea 
Superfamily †Oedischioidea 
Family †Anelcanidae 
Family †Bintoniellidae 
Family †Mesoedischiidae 
Family †Oedischiidae 
Family †Proparagryllacrididae 
Family †Pruvostitidae 
Family incertae sedis
Genus †Crinoedischia 
Genus †Loxoedischia 
Superfamily †Triassomantoidea 
Family †Adumbratomorphidae 
Family †Triassomantidae 
Superfamily †Xenopteroidea 
Family †Xenopteridae 
Superfamily incertae sedis
family †Permotettigoniidae 
Family incertae sedis
Genus †Permophyllum 
Infraorder Tettigoniidea 
Superfamily Hagloidea - grigs
Family †Eospilopteronidae 
Family †Haglidae 
Family †Hagloedischiidae 
Family †Prezottophlebiidae 
Family Prophalangopsidae 
Family †Tuphellidae 
Superfamily †Phasmomimoidea 
Family †Phasmomimidae 
Superfamily Rhaphidophoroidea 
Family Rhaphidophoridae  - camel crickets, cave crickets, cave wētā
Superfamily Schizodactyloidea 
Family Schizodactylidae  - dune or splay-footed crickets
Superfamily Stenopelmatoidea 
Family Anostostomatidae  - wētā (except cave wētā), king crickets
Family Cooloolidae  - Cooloola monsters
Family Gryllacrididae  - leaf-rolling crickets
Family  Stenopelmatidae  - Jerusalem crickets
Superfamily Tettigonioidea 
Family †Haglotettigoniidae 
Family Tettigoniidae - bush crickets, katydids, koringkrieks
Superfamily Incertae sedis
Family incertae sedis
Genus †Tettoraptor 
Infraorder incertae sedis
Superfamily †Gryllavoidea  
Family †Gryllavidae 
Superfamily Incertae sedis
 Family †Palaeorehniidae (syn "Zeuneropterinae")
Family †Vitimiidae

Phylogeny

The phylogenetic relationships of the Ensifera, summarized by Darryl Gwynne in 1995 from his own work and that of earlier authors, are shown in the following cladogram, with the Orthoptera divided into two main groups, Ensifera and Caelifera (grasshoppers). Fossil Ensifera are found from the late Carboniferous period onwards.

The oldest known fossil in the Archaeorthoptera, the crown group of the Orthoptera, and also the oldest member of the Pterygota (winged insects), is from the Namurian (324 mya) Lower Carboniferous beds in the Upper Silesian Basin of the Czech Republic.

Notes

References

External links
 The Orthopterists' Society

 
Insect suborders
Cisuralian first appearances
Extant Permian first appearances